James Findlay Schenck (June 11, 1807 – December 21, 1882) was a rear admiral in the United States Navy who served in the Mexican–American War and the American Civil War.  His younger brother, Robert C. Schenck, was a Union Army general and a United States Ambassador to Brazil.

Biography
Born in Franklin, Ohio, he was the son of William C. Schenck, the founder of Franklin. He entered West Point as a cadet in the class of 1826, but left before graduation.  Schenck was appointed midshipman in the United States Navy in 1825, and later promoted to lieutenant. During the Mexican–American War, he served under Commodore Stockton in the Conquest of California.  In 1846, Schenck planted American victory flags at Santa Barbara, San Pedro and Pueblo de Los Angeles, claiming the areas as United States territory.

Schenck also commanded  and the 3rd Division of Admiral David Dixon Porter's fleet in operations against Fort Fisher, and was mentioned for gallantry in Admiral Porter's action report. He was later promoted to rear admiral on September 21, 1868, and retired on June 11, 1869.

Rear Admiral Schenck died at Dayton, Ohio, and is interred in the Woodland Cemetery in Dayton.

Namesake
 The destroyer  (1919–1946) was named for him.

References

External links
 Franklin's Admiral James Findlay Schenck : Warren County Local History by Dallas Bogan

1807 births
1882 deaths
United States Navy admirals
American people of Dutch descent
People from Franklin, Ohio
People of Ohio in the American Civil War
Union Navy officers
Burials at Woodland Cemetery and Arboretum